Glykorrizi (before 1927: Μουρτάτο - Mourtato) is a small village situated in the Peloponnese, southern Greece. It is located in the north-western part of Messenia, and is part of the municipal unit of Aetos. The population of the community has been estimated at 60 people but during the summer this number may more than double.

Glykorrizi is situated on a hillside, at 260 m elevation. It is surrounded by farmlands and small forests. It is 1 km west of Kamari, 4 km south of Sidirokastro, 5 km northwest of Kopanaki, the former seat of Aetos, 7 km east of Kalo Nero and 11 km northeast of Kyparissia.

Population

History 

The area in which the village is found has been continuously populated for at least the past 400 years, according to both Venetian and Byzantine records, but had never numbered more than a handful of families. The village experienced a steady increase in inhabitants prior to and after the Greek War of Independence.

Since the end of the Second World War and the Greek Civil War a significant portion of the local population resettled in Athens or immigrated to Australia, the United States and Canada.

Today 

The community currently has two small cafes, or kafeneia as they are known in Greek, a church dedicated to the Virgin Mary and a smaller chapel of St. John which served as a krifo scholio ("secret school") during Ottoman rule.  There are two churches and a big square.  The former public school has been converted into a meeting place for its inhabitants.  At the entrance of the village, the Avaros spring is situated.

See also

List of settlements in Messenia

References

External links 
Glykorrizi at the GTP Travel Pages

Populated places in Messenia